Podhom is a settlement in the Municipality of Gorje in the Upper Carniola region of Slovenia. In addition to the main settlement, it also consists of the hamlets of Spodnji Graben, Gabrce, Vintgar, and Vršce to the west.

Name
The name Podhom is a fused prepositional phrase that has lost its case ending, from pod 'below' + Hom 'Hom Hill'. Hom Hill (834 m) stands north of Podhom. The name Podhom therefore literally means 'below Hom Hill'. Podhom was known as Buchheim in German in the past.

Notable people 
Notable people that were born or lived in Podhom include:
Albin Belar (1864–1939), seismologist
Andrej Žumer (1847–1903), teacher and editor

References

External links

Podhom on Geopedia

Populated places in the Municipality of Gorje